The frosted orange moth (Gortyna flavago) is a moth of the family Noctuidae which is found in Europe, Armenia, Syria and east through the Palearctic to western Siberia. It has also been recorded in Algeria. The species was first described by Michael Denis and Ignaz Schiffermüller in 1775. The frosted orange is a night-flying species with orange and brown speckled wings allow for perfect camouflage against autumn leaves in the daytime. It is attracted to light and does not come to flowers, and its larva inhabit the stems and roots of the species' food plants.

Technical description and variation

Its wingspan ranges from 3 to 4.3 cm. The forewing is yellow, thickly dusted with bright ferruginous, the space between subbasal and inner lines and that between outer and submarginal lines, filled up with dull liver brown; the lines and veins finely red brown; all three stigmata pale yellow with darker centres and brown outlines, the reniform containing an outlined lunule; submarginal line yellowish ending in a yellow apical blotch: hindwing dirty luteous (muddy yellow), with veins and cellspot, the outer line and a submarginal cloud grey; - in ab. suffusa ab. nov. [Warren] the forewing is wholly suffused with ferruginous; - cinarea Goosens from Algeria is pale yellow or reddish grey, with a dark patch between the stigmata, which are almost obsolete: the terminal area of ground colour or violet brown without any pale apical patch: hindwing without markings, whitish grey.

Biology

It flies between August and October. Northern variants tend to be slightly darker.

The Larva is dirty white or yellowish, the dorsum dark red, with three faintly paler longitudinal lines; tubercles, and also the spiracles, black; head and plates dark brown. They feed on Sambucus racemosa, Filipendula ulmaria, Helianthus annuus and Arctium species – Arctium tomentosum, A. minus. The larvae are considered a pest on foxglove (Digitalis purpurea).

References

 Wildlife of Britain: The Definitive Visual Guide by Dorling Kindersley and the RSPB.

External links

 
  Taxonomy
 Fauna Europaea
 Lepiforum e.V.
 De Vlinderstichting 

Hadeninae
Moths described in 1775
Lepidoptera of North Africa
Moths of Asia
Moths of Europe
Taxa named by Michael Denis
Taxa named by Ignaz Schiffermüller